Patricia Ann Blair is an American calligrapher. She served as White House chief calligrapher and director of the Graphics and Calligraphy Office at the White House.

Blair's work has been published in Letter Arts Review, Scripsit, Martha Stewart Weddings, and Tabellae Ansatae. She is a member of the faculty of the Loudoun Academy of the Arts, and has been on the faculty of numerous International Calligraphy Conferences. Blair is past president of the Washington Calligraphers Guild, and was co-director of Letterforum, at the 26th International Calligraphy Conference.

In 2005, Pat Blair was awarded the honor "Master Penman" by the International Association of Master Penmen, Engrossers and Teachers of Handwriting for her Spencerian round hand style of script used in White House invitations.

In March 2013, Blair's over $96,000 annual salary, and the salary of her two deputy calligraphers, became a source of debate when published by the White House and reported online.

References

Swerdloff, L. (2008) "White House calligraphers: Patricia Blair, Debra Brown, Rick Muffler". Scripsit (Journal of the Washington Calligraphers' Guild) vol 29, no. 3/vol. 30, no. 1, Fall 2007/Winter 2008, pp. 2–11.

External links
website of The International Association of Master Penmen, Engrossers and Teachers of Handwriting
website of The Washington Calligraphers Guild

American calligraphers
Living people
Women calligraphers
Year of birth missing (living people)